Florencio Tumbocon Miraflores (born July 1, 1951) is a Filipino politician. "Joeben" was born in Ibajay, Aklan to parents Dr. Jose Conlu Miraflores and Eusebia Tumbocon. He is married to Ma. Lourdes Villanueva Martin. He graduated valedictorian at St. Clement's College, Iloilo and finished Industrial and Management Engineering at De La Salle University. He was Mayor of Ibajay from 1988 to 1995, and Governor of Aklan from 1995 to 2004 and from 2013 to 2022

A member of the KAMPI party, he has been elected to two terms as a Member of the House of Representatives, representing the Lone District of Aklan. First elected in 2004, he was re-elected in 2007 and 2010. 

On June 29, 2008, Miraflores was rushed to a hospital in Kalibo, Aklan after complaining of chest pains and difficulty in breathing; initial tests indicated that his heartbeat was irregular. At the time he was stricken ill, Miraflores had been engaged in relief operations for his province, which had been devastated by Typhoon Fengshen.

References

 

He voted in favor of the Constitutional Assembly which was strongly opposed by majority of the Philippine population.

Notes

|-

|-

|-

1951 births
Living people
Governors of Aklan
Kabalikat ng Malayang Pilipino politicians
Liberal Party (Philippines) politicians
Members of the House of Representatives of the Philippines from Aklan
Mayors of places in Aklan
Lakas–CMD politicians
People from Aklan
De La Salle University alumni
PDP–Laban politicians